Andreas Josenhans (born 12 September 1950) is a German-born Canadian sailor who competed in the 1976 Summer Olympics.

Career
He was a member of the youngest of the Olympic sailing crews at the Montreal 1976 Olympics, with fellow sailors Glen Dexter and Sandy MacMillan. The team placed 8th. The team went on to become the World Class Soling Champions in 1977 and 1980. Andreas Josenhans was a crew member on America 3, winning the America's Cup in 1992. He was also a member of the Young America crew in 1995.

Andreas Josenhans has worked in management at North Sails for over 25 years. He is considered the Swan 45 Class Leader within North Sails. He has sailed in most major sailing events across the globe with a variety of teams. Andreas Josenhans has also published a variety of articles on sailing and sail design.

Andreas Josenhans currently resides in Nova Scotia, Canada. He was inducted into Canada's Sports Hall of Fame in 1981.

References

External links
 
 
 
 

1950 births
Living people
1987 America's Cup sailors
1992 America's Cup sailors
1995 America's Cup sailors
Canadian male sailors (sport)
Canadian people of German descent
Olympic sailors of Canada
Sailors at the 1976 Summer Olympics – Soling
Star class world champions
World champions in sailing for Canada
Soling class world champions